The Council of Priests of Abkhazia unites the seven principal priests of the Abkhazian traditional religion, who are responsible for the Seven Shrines of Abkhazia. The council was formally constituted on 3 August 2012. Its chairman is Zaur Chichba, the priest of Dydrypsh, and its executive secretary Khajarat Khvartskhia.

References

Caucasian Neopaganism
Modern pagan organizations established in the 2010s
Abkhazian religious leaders
Religion in Abkhazia
Religious organizations established in 2012